Jay McNamar (born February 12, 1947) is a Minnesota politician and former member of the Minnesota House of Representatives. A member of the Minnesota Democratic–Farmer–Labor Party (DFL), he represented District 12A in western Minnesota during the 88th session of the Minnesota legislature.

Education
McNamar graduated from Ada High School in Ada, Minnesota. He attended the Ellendale Center–University of North Dakota, graduating with a B.S.

Minnesota House of Representatives
McNamar was first elected to the Minnesota House of Representatives in 2012. He was defeated by Republican Jeff Backer during his campaign for reelection in 2014.

Personal life
McNamar is married to his wife, Robin. They have two children and reside in Elbow Lake, Minnesota, where he served as mayor. He is a retired teacher.

References

External links

Rep. Jay McNamar official Minnesota House of Representatives website
Rep. Jay McNamar official campaign website

1947 births
Living people
Members of the Minnesota House of Representatives
21st-century American politicians
People from Elbow Lake, Minnesota
Mayors of places in Minnesota